The 1974 Iowa State Senate elections took place as part of the biennial 1974 United States elections. Iowa voters elected state senators in 26 of the state senate's districts—the 25 odd-numbered state senate districts and a special election in district 10. State senators serve four-year terms in the Iowa State Senate, with half of the seats up for regularly-scheduled election each cycle. A statewide map of the 50 state Senate districts in the year 1974 is provided by the Iowa General Assembly here.

The primary election on June 4, 1974 determined which candidates appeared on the November 5, 1974 general election ballot. Primary election results can be obtained here. General election results can be obtained here.

Following the previous election in 1972, Republicans had control of the Iowa state Senate with 28 seats to Democrats' 22 seats.

To take control of the chamber from Republicans, the Democrats needed to net 4 Senate seats.

Democrats flipped control of the Iowa State Senate following the 1974 general election, with Democrats claiming 26 seats and Republicans falling to 24 seats after the election (a net gain of 4 seats for the Democrats).

Summary of Results
NOTE: 24 of the even-numbered districts did not have elections in 1974 so they are not listed here (district 10 had a special election).

Source:

Detailed Results
Reminder: All odd-numbered Iowa Senate seats were up for regularly-scheduled election in 1974 as well as a special election in the 10th district. All other even-numbered districts did not have elections in 1974.

Note: If a district does not list a primary, then that district did not have a competitive primary (i.e., there may have only been one candidate file for that district).

District 1

District 3

District 5

District 7

District 9

District 10

District 11

District 13

District 15

District 17

District 19

District 21

District 23

District 25

District 27

District 29

District 31

District 33

District 35

District 37

District 39

District 41

District 43

District 45

District 47

District 49

See also
 United States elections, 1974
 United States House of Representatives elections in Iowa, 1974
 Elections in Iowa

References

1974 Iowa elections
Iowa Senate elections
Iowa State Senate